Mo Mi is a large intersection located in the centre of Bangkok's Chinatown quarter overlaps between Pom Prap of Pom Prap Sattru Phai district and Talat Noi with Samphanthawong of Samphanthawong district.

This intersection consists of the following roads: Charoen Krung (toward Odeon Circle and Wat Traimit), Rama IV (toward Hua Lamphong), Song Sawat (from Wat Samphanthawong and Sampheng, via Song Wat road) and Mittraphan (toward July 22nd Circle). 

The boundaries of Mo Mi are considered to be where Rama IV and Mittraphan roads originate, and where Song Sawat road terminates. 

Mo Mi, formerly and still colloquially known as Sam Yaek (สามแยก), which means "Three-Way Junction," and Sam Yaek Charoen Krung (สามแยกเจริญกรุง), meaning "Three-Way Junction of Charoen Krung." The original name of Mo Mi came from the fact that during King Mongkut (Rama IV)'s reign, Mo Mi was only a three-way junction consisting of Charoen Krung and Thanon Trong roads which later became Rama IV road.

Charoen Krung Road that runs through this area from Damrong Sathit bridge (Saphan Lek) to here also serves as an administrative boundary between Pom Prap Sattru Phai (left side) with Samphanthwawong (right side) districts, and also has one-way traffic as well.

Under the past administration of Amphoe Samphanthawong, this area or tambon (ตำบล; sub-district) was called "Tambon Sam Yaek" in the province of Phra Nakhon (known today as Bangkok).

In 1898, a fire occurred in this area, spreading rapidly across the neighborhood because of its contemporary design of wooden framing with thatched roofs combined with the high density of houses. Since then, the government in general banned the construction of wooden dwellings. The surviving Phlapphla Chai 2 Police Station site on Phlapphla Chai road was known as Sam Yaek Police Station at the time of the fire.

"Mo Mi" was named after Mo Mi or Boonmi Kasemsuvan, a pharmacist who specialized in herbal and medical chemistry, especially Snuff. His dispensary was located in the area.

The area around Mo Mi in the past was well-known as a centre of chick and duckling stores, but at present there is only one left on Rama IV road. It was also home to many leading movie theaters, currently closed to the business

One interesting thing about this intersection is the location of Tai Sia Huk Chou Shrine, a small old joss house on Rama IV road, the only one shrine dedicated to Sun Wukong in this area (Chinatown).

References 

 Neighbourhoods of Bangkok
Samphanthawong district
Pom Prap Sattru Phai district
 Road junctions in Bangkok